Parliamentary elections were held in Algeria on 26 December 1991. They were the first multi-party elections since independence, but were cancelled by a military coup after the first round when the military expressed concerns that the Islamic Salvation Front, which was almost certain to win more than the two-thirds majority of seats required to change the constitution, would form an Islamic state. The annulling of the elections led to the outbreak of the Algerian Civil War.

Of 430 seats contested, 232 were won outright with 50% or more of the first-round vote; the remaining 198 would have proceeded to a second round contested only by the two candidates with the highest number of votes. Voter turnout in the first-round was 59.0%.

Results

Notes

References

Elections in Algeria
Algeria
1991 in Algeria
Algerian Civil War
Annulled elections